This is a list of the municipalities in the province and autonomous community of Navarre, Spain.

See also

Geography of Spain
List of cities in Spain

Navarre